Brewster is a city in Thomas County, Kansas, United States.  As of the 2020 census, the population of the city was 291.

History
Brewster was named for L.D. Brewster, a railroad official. Brewster was a station and shipping point on the Chicago, Rock Island and Pacific Railroad.

The first post office in Brewster was established in September 1888.

Geography
Brewster is located at  (39.362878, -101.376552).

Climate
According to the Köppen climate classification system, Brewster has a semi-arid climate, abbreviated "BSk" on climate maps.

Demographics

2010 census
As of the census of 2010, there were 305 people, 122 households, and 87 families residing in the city. The racial makeup of the city was 92.5% White, 2.0% Native American, 0.3% Asian, 0.3% Pacific Islander, 3.9% from other races, and 1.0% from two or more races. Hispanic or Latino of any race were 9.8% of the population.

There were 122 households, of which 33.6% had children under the age of 18 living with them, 56.6% were married couples living together, 10.7% had a female householder with no husband present, 4.1% had a male householder with no wife present, and 28.7% were non-families. 26.2% of all households were made up of individuals, and 14.8% had someone living alone who was 65 years of age or older. The average household size was 2.50 and the average family size was 2.97.

The median age in the city was 40.4 years. 29.2% of residents were under the age of 18; 5.3% were between the ages of 18 and 24; 22.2% were from 25 to 44; 22.6% were from 45 to 64; and 20.7% were 65 years of age or older. The gender makeup of the city was 51.8% male and 48.2% female.

2000 census
As of the census of 2000, there were 285 people, 115 households, and 81 families residing in the city. The racial makeup of the city was 95.44% White, 2.46% from other races, and 2.11% from two or more races. Hispanic or Latino of any race were 4.56% of the population.

There were 115 households, out of which 35.7% had children under the age of 18 living with them, 66.1% were married couples living together, 3.5% had a female householder with no husband present, and 28.7% were non-families. 26.1% of all households were made up of individuals, and 17.4% had someone living alone who was 65 years of age or older. The average household size was 2.48 and the average family size was 3.01.

In the city, the population was spread out, with 29.5% under the age of 18, 3.2% from 18 to 24, 22.5% from 25 to 44, 21.4% from 45 to 64, and 23.5% who were 65 years of age or older. The median age was 40 years. For every 100 females, there were 99.3 males. For every 100 females age 18 and over, there were 95.1 males.

The median income for a household in the city was $34,063, and the median income for a family was $40,139. Males had a median income of $27,917 versus $24,375 for females. The per capita income for the city was $14,562. About 7.4% of families and 11.1% of the population were below the poverty line, including 7.7% of those under the age of eighteen and 11.7% of those 65 or over.

Education
Brewster is served by Brewster USD 314.

The Brewster Bulldogs have won the following Kansas State High School championships:
 1968 Boys Basketball - Class BB
 1995 Boys Basketball - Class 1A
 2000 Boys Basketball - Class 1A
 2001 Boys Basketball - Class 1A

References

Further reading

External links
 City of Brewster
 Brewster - Directory of Public Officials
 USD 314, local school district
 Brewster city map, KDOT

Cities in Kansas
Cities in Thomas County, Kansas